Hyalogyrina is a genus of sea snails, marine gastropod mollusks in the family Hyalogyrinidae.

Species
Species within the genus Hyalogyrina include:
 Hyalogyrina amphorae Warén, Carrozza & Rocchini, 1997
 Hyalogyrina depressa Hasegawa, 1997
 Hyalogyrina glabra B. A. Marshall, 1988
 Hyalogyrina globularis Warén & Bouchet, 2001
 Hyalogyrina grasslei Warén & Bouchet, 1993
 † Hyalogyrina knorringfjelletensis Kaim, Hryniewic, Little & Nakrem, 2017 
 Hyalogyrina rissoella Warén & Bouchet, 2009
 Hyalogyrina umbellifera Warén & Bouchet, 2001

References

 Marshall, B. A. (1988). Skeneidae, Vitrinellidae and Orbitestellidae (Mollusca: Gastropoda) associated with biogenic substrata from bathyal depths off New Zealand and New South Wales. Journal of Natural History. 22(4): 949–1004
 Gofas, S.; Le Renard, J.; Bouchet, P. (2001). Mollusca, in: Costello, M.J. et al. (Ed.) (2001). European register of marine species: a check-list of the marine species in Europe and a bibliography of guides to their identification. Collection Patrimoines Naturels, 50: pp. 180–213
 Spencer, H.; Marshall. B. (2009). All Mollusca except Opisthobranchia. In: Gordon, D. (Ed.) (2009). New Zealand Inventory of Biodiversity. Volume One: Kingdom Animalia. 584 pp

External links

 B. A. (1988). Skeneidae, Vitrinellidae and Orbitestellidae (Mollusca: Gastropoda) associated with biogenic substrata from bathyal depths off New Zealand and New South Wales. Journal of Natural History. 22(4): 949–1004